Seth Unger is a co-founder of NYC TV now called NYC Media, the network he and Arick Wierson launched in 2003 while working for Mayor Michael Bloomberg. Among Unger's most notable accomplishments at the network is the creation of "Blueprint | NYC", a documentary series that highlights local architectural and historical interests in New York City. In 2004, the series won five local New York Emmy Awards. Previous to joining NYC TV, Unger was an executive at Messenger Records, later leaving to work as a campaign aide to Michael Bloomberg in 2001.  Unger retired from NYC TV in 2006 to spend more time with his daughters.

He is a 1997 graduate of Columbia University. He is married to wife Allison Jaffin, a top aide to Mayor Bloomberg who followed him into politics from Bloomberg's eponymous financial and media empire, Bloomberg, LP. Together they have twin daughters

References

Columbia University alumni
Living people
Year of birth missing (living people)